The 2012 Vancouver Island Shootout was held from November 9 to 12 at the Victoria Curling Club in Victoria, British Columbia as part of the 2012–13 World Curling Tour. The event was held in a triple knockout format, and the purses for the men's and women's events were CAD$14,000 each, of which the winners of each event received CAD$5,000. In the men's final, Jay Wakefield defeated Neil Dangerfield with a score of 9–2, while in the women's final, Roberta Kuhn defeated Heather Jensen with a score of 5–3.

Men

Teams
The teams are listed as follows:

Knockout results
The draw is listed as follows:

A event

B event

C event

Playoffs
The playoffs draw is listed as follows:

Women

Teams
The teams are listed as follows:

Knockout results
The draw is listed as follows:

A event

B event

C event

Playoffs
The playoffs draw is listed as follows:

References

External links

Vancouver Island Shootout
Vancouver Island Shootout
Vancouver Island Shootout
Curling in British Columbia